Cyclopropylmescaline (CPM or 4-cyclopropylmethoxy-3,5-dimethoxyphenethylamine) is a lesser-known psychedelic drug. CPM was first synthesized by Alexander Shulgin. In his book PiHKAL, the dosage range is listed as 60–80 mg and the duration listed as 12–18 hours. CPM produces closed-eye imagery, visuals, and fantasies.  It also causes enhancement of music.  Very little data exists about the pharmacological properties, metabolism, and toxicity of CPM.

See also 
 Phenethylamine
 Psychedelics, dissociatives and deliriants

References

Psychedelic phenethylamines
Mescalines
Cyclopropyl compounds